Tumpung is a town in Karbi Anglong district, Assam, India.

Geography
It is located at an elevation of 71 m above mean sea level.

Location
Nearest railway station is at Lanka and the nearest airport is Dimapur Airport. It is connected by National Highway 36 to Dimapur, which is 66 km away.

References

External links
 Satellite map of Karbi Anglong
 About Tumpung

Cities and towns in Karbi Anglong district